The Former United States Post Office of Kaukauna, Wisconsin, United States, was designed by Louis A. Simon and built around 1934. It was added to the National Register of Historic Places in 1992 for its significance in politics, government and architecture. It previously contained the mural of Grignon trading with the Indians, by Vladimir Rousseff, which is now in the new post office.

References

External links

Colonial Revival architecture in Wisconsin
Georgian Revival architecture in Wisconsin
Government buildings completed in 1934
Streamline Moderne architecture in Wisconsin
Post office buildings on the National Register of Historic Places in Wisconsin
Treasury Relief Art Project
National Register of Historic Places in Outagamie County, Wisconsin
1934 establishments in Wisconsin